Ayni or Aini may refer to: 
Aini, Maharashtra, a small village in Ratnagiri district, Maharashtra state in Western India
Ayni District in Sughd Province, Tajikistan
Ayni, Ayni District, the capital of Ayni District in Tajikistan
Ayni, Varzob District, a town in Varzob district, Tajikistan
Farkhor Air Base, aka Ayni Air Base, in Tajikistan
Badr al-Din al-Ayni, Islamic scholar
Lea Aini, Israeli author
Sadriddin Aini, Tajik writer
Artocarpus hirsutus, a tropical evergreen tree
Äynu people, a people from the Xinjiang region of western China
Äynu language, the language of the Äynu
Áine, an Irish goddess
Ayni, a form of communal work in the Andes